The TM-89 is a Russian anti-tank mine first publicly shown in 1993. The mine uses a Misznay Schardin effect warhead capable of producing a 60 mm diameter hole in 100 mm of armour. The mine is fitted with a two-channel magnetic influence fuze, and can be laid from the GMZ-3 mine layer or by the VMR-2 helicopter mine layer.

Specifications
Weight: 11.5 kg
Diameter: 320 mm
Height: 131 mm
Explosive content: 6.7 kg of TG-40 (60% RDX 40% TNT)

See also
Anti-tank mine
Land mine

References

 Jane's Mines and Mine Clearance 2005–2006.

Anti-tank mines